Newhouse is an English surname. Notable people with the surname include:

Alana Newhouse, writer and editor
Dan Newhouse, American politician
Donald Newhouse (born 1930), publisher
Flower A. Newhouse (1909–1994),  Christian mystic and spiritual teacher
Fred Newhouse (born 1948), American Olympic runner
Joseph Newhouse (born 1942), American economist
Julian O. Newhouse (1915-2006), American businessman and politician
Mark Newhouse (born 1985), American professional poker player
Neil Newhouse, American pollster
Richard H. Newhouse, Jr. (1924–2002), American politician
Samuel Newhouse (1853–1930), Utah entrepreneur and mining magnate
Samuel Irving Newhouse, Sr. (1895–1979) American broadcasting businessman, magazine and newspaper publisher
Samuel Irving Newhouse, Jr. (1927–2017), chairman and CEO of Advance Publications

English-language surnames